General James Burr Davis (born November 14, 1935) is a retired U.S. Air Force general and was chief of staff, Supreme Headquarters Allied Powers Europe in Mons, Belgium.

Biography

Early life and qualifications
General Davis was born in Wayne, Nebraska, in 1935, (Parents Mary Ellen Vallery & Burr Russell Davis) where he attended Wayne City High School and Wayne State College. He earned a bachelor's degree in electrical engineering from the U.S. Naval Academy in 1958 and a master's degree in public administration from Auburn University in 1976. He completed Armed Forces Staff College in 1971 and Air War College as a distinguished graduate in 1976.

Early flight experience
The general completed pilot training at Bartow Air Force Base, Florida, and Greenville Air Force Base, Mississippi. After receiving wings in 1959, he was assigned as a KC-97 Stratofreighter pilot with the 4050th Air Refueling Wing, Westover Air Force Base, Massachusetts. In December 1964 he was assigned to Headquarters 8th Air Force, Westover. In July 1966 he moved to the Office of the Deputy Chief of Staff for Personnel, Headquarters U.S. Air Force, Washington, D.C., as an action officer in the Special Actions Branch. He transferred in June 1967 to George Air Force Base, California for F-4 Phantom II replacement training.

Vietnam
In January 1968 the general was assigned to the 13th Tactical Fighter Squadron, Udon Royal Thai Air Force Base, Thailand, serving as a combat pilot and assistant operations officer. By September 1968 he had flown 100 combat missions over North Vietnam. In October 1968 he was selected as aide to the commander in chief, U.S. Air Forces in Europe, Lindsey Air Station, West Germany. Three months later, when the commander in chief was assigned to Supreme Headquarters Allied Powers Europe in Belgium, General Davis also moved and became the aide to the chief of staff there.

Staff college
After graduating from the Armed Forces Staff College in June 1971, he transferred to the Air Force Military Personnel Center at Randolph Air Force Base, Texas. During this tour of duty, he served as chief, Special Category Manning Section, then deputy chief and, later, chief of the Rated Career Management Branch. In June 1976 he graduated from the Air War College and was assigned to the 388th Tactical Fighter Wing, Hill Air Force Base, Utah, first as assistant deputy commander for operations, then as deputy commander for operations and, later, as vice commander.

Commands
From May 1979 to June 1980 he commanded the 474th Tactical Fighter Wing, Nellis Air Force Base, Nevada. General Davis then transferred to Langley Air Force Base, Virginia, and served as Tactical Air Command's deputy chief of staff for personnel. In September 1982 he was assigned as director of personnel programs in the Office of the Deputy Chief of Staff, Manpower and Personnel, Air Force headquarters. The general became assistant deputy chief of staff for military personnel, Air Force headquarters, and commander, Air Force Military Personnel Center, in September 1984. He then served as deputy chief of staff for operations and intelligence, Headquarters Pacific Air Forces, Hickam Air Force Base, Hawaii, from August 1986 until August 1987, when he became vice commander in chief, Pacific Air Forces. From January 1988 until July 1991 he was commander of U.S. Forces Japan, and 5th Air Force, Yokota Air Base, Japan. Additionally, from November 5, 1990, until February 18, 1991, General Davis concurrently served as commander, Pacific Air Forces. He assumed final position in July 1991.

Honors
The general was a command pilot with more than 4,500 flying hours, including 270 combat hours. His military awards and decorations include the Defense Distinguished Service Medal, Air Force Distinguished Service Medal, Legion of Merit with two oak leaf clusters, Distinguished Flying Cross with oak leaf cluster, Meritorious Service Medal, Air Medal with 10 oak leaf clusters, Air Force Commendation Medal with two oak leaf clusters, Presidential Unit Citation, Air Force Outstanding Unit Award with "V" device and two oak leaf clusters, National Defense Service Medal with two service stars, Armed Forces Expeditionary Medal, Vietnam Service Medal with silver service star, Air Force Overseas Ribbon-Short, Air Force Overseas Ribbon-Long, Air Force Longevity Service Award Ribbon with eight oak leaf clusters, Small Arms Expert Marksmanship Ribbon, Air Force Training Ribbon, Republic of Vietnam Gallantry Cross with Palm and Republic of Vietnam Campaign Medal. He also has received the Order of National Security Merit, Gouges Medal – South Korea, Grand Cordon of the Order of the Sacred Treasure – Japan, and Award of Knight Grand Cross with Sash – Thailand. Additionally, he has been inducted into the Order of the Sword, which is the highest honor noncommissioned officers can bestow.

Retirement
He was promoted to general on July 24, 1991, with same date of rank, and retired from the Air Force on August 1, 1993. He currently enjoys his retirement drinking wet cappuccinos and having an excellent sense of humor.

References

1935 births
Living people
United States Air Force personnel of the Vietnam War
Auburn University alumni
Order of National Security Merit members
People from Wayne, Nebraska
Recipients of the Air Medal
Recipients of the Distinguished Flying Cross (United States)
Recipients of the Legion of Merit
Recipients of the Order of the Sacred Treasure
Recipients of the Order of the Sword (United States)
Recipients of the Gallantry Cross (Vietnam)
United States Air Force generals
United States Naval Academy alumni
Wayne State College alumni
Recipients of the Defense Distinguished Service Medal
Recipients of the Air Force Distinguished Service Medal